Joe Navarro (born May 26, 1953) is a Cuban-born American author, public speaker, and former FBI agent and supervisor. Navarro specializes in the area of nonverbal communication and body language, and has authored numerous books, including What Every Body Is Saying, Dangerous Personalities, Louder Than Words, Three Minutes to Doomsday, and The Dictionary of Body Language.

Background
Navarro moved to the US at age eight with his family shortly after the Bay of Pigs Invasion in Cuba. After earning a bachelor's degree in Justice Administration from Brigham Young University and a Master of Arts in International Relations from Slippery Rock University, he worked as an FBI special agent and supervisor in the area of counterintelligence and behavioral assessment for 25 years. He is one of the founding members of the FBI's elite Behavioral Analysis Program and he also served as a SWAT Team Commander and Bureau Pilot. Since retiring from the FBI, Navarro writes books and lectures to share his knowledge of human behavior.  He is on the adjunct faculty at Saint Leo University and has lectured multiple times at the Harvard Business School.  Since 2003, Navarro has been a consultant to the State Departments and is a fellow with the Institute for Intergovernmental Research.

In 2005, Navarro got involved in the World Series of Poker Academy, training players on poker tells after a chance meeting with Annie Duke on a Discovery Channel program about detecting lies.

Since 2009, Navarro has been a regular contributor to Psychology Today Magazine (Spycatcher blog) and in 2008 he wrote "Every Body's Talking" as a special for the Washington Post.

Navarro's book Three Minutes to Doomsday was published by Scribner, a division of Simon & Schuster. Smoke House Pictures, George Clooney and Grant Heslov's production company, has picked up the book, which is based on the work Navarro did as the FBI's top body language expert during the Cold War.

Books
Navarro is the author of thirteen books. What Every Body is Saying is his best-known body language book, an international bestseller available in 27 languages. His most recent book is The Dictionary of Body Language, which was published in September 2018. Navarro's book Louder Than Words was elected as one of Six Best Business Books to Read for Your Career in 2010 by Wall Street Journal's Digital Network, FINS.  Navarro is also the author of Three Minutes to Doomsday, Hunting Terrorists, Advanced Interviewing Techniques, and Read 'Em and Reap, as well as a series of short booklets available as e-books, written exclusively for Amazon Kindle.

Education initiatives
In 2009, Navarro partnered with Nightingale-Conant, the world's largest producer of self-improvement audio programs, and produced The Power of Body Language. He also launched an online course in 2009 to share his knowledge with others on how to observe, decode, and utilize nonverbals in their personal and professional life. This was undertaken for the benefit of those who could not travel to attend his seminars.

Partial bibliography
 Schafer, John and Joe Navarro (2004) Advanced Interviewing Techniques; Proven Strategies for Law Enforcement, Military, and Security Personnel. Charles C. Thomas, Springfield, Illinois.  .
 Navarro, Joe (2005) Hunting Terrorists: A Look at The Psychopathology of Terror. Charles C. Thomas, Springfield, Illinois. .
 Navarro, Joe (2006) Read 'Em and Reap. HarperCollins, Pub. .
 Navarro, Joe (2008) What Every Body is Saying. HarperCollins, Pub. .
 Navarro, Joe "Every Body's Talking," Special to Washington Post, June 24, 2008, F1.
 Navarro, Joe (2010) Louder Than Words: Take Your Career from Average to Exceptional with the Hidden Power of Nonverbal Intelligence. HarperCollins, Pub. .
 Navarro, Joe (2014) Dangerous Personalities. Rodale Books, Pub. 
 Navarro, Joe (2017) Three Minutes to Doomsday: An Agent, a Traitor, and the Worst Espionage Breach in U.S. History. Scribner. 
 Navarro, Joe (2018) The Dictionary of Body Language: A Field Guide to Human Behavior. William Morrow.

References

External links
 
 Joe Navarro's Body Language Academy
 Blog on Psychology Today
 Joe Navarro interview on CNN

Living people
Cuban emigrants to the United States
Brigham Young University alumni
Saint Leo University
Federal Bureau of Investigation agents
Nonverbal communication
1953 births